Johan Stephan Leonard "Hans" Gualthérie van Weezel (born 26 July 1941) is a Dutch former diplomat and politician. He worked as a diplomat for the Dutch Ministry for Foreign Affairs between 1970 and 1977. Subsequently he served in the House of Representatives between 1977 and 1992. After his political career ended he returned to diplomacy and was Permanent Representative of the Netherlands to the Council of Europe until August 1998 and afterwards Ambassador to Luxembourg until 2005.

Career
Hans Gualthérie van Weezel was born on 26 July 1941 in Velsen, during World War II. His father Jan was active in the Dutch resistance and later became chief commissioner of police in The Hague. Gualthérie van Weezel went to high school in The Hague, graduating in 1962. He subsequently went to Leiden University to study Dutch law. He went to study law rather than history, which he had intended to do, since his father valued the title of master of law over a title in history.

After his studies Gualthérie van Weezel joined the diplomatic service of the Ministry for Foreign Affairs. He was third embassy secretary in Brussels between 1971 and 1975 and afterwards was second embassy secretary in Lagos for two years. He then returned to the Netherlands and was spokesperson for the Ministry until June 1977.

Gualthérie van Weezel joined the House of Representatives after the 1977 general elections. He was a member of the Christian Historical Union, which in 1980 merged into the Christian Democratic Appeal. In the House of Representatives Gualthérie van Weezel served as spokesperson for Foreign Affairs for the Christian Democratic Appeal. He was on the right side in the party.

After his political career ended in 1992 he returned to diplomacy and was Permanent Representative of the Netherlands to the Council of Europe until August 1998, and subsequently Ambassador to Luxembourg until 2005.

In 2014, as head of the Commission Integral Supervision Return of the Ministry of Security and Justice he stated that the asylum policy of the Netherlands would attract more refugees. He argued that a European policy to counter refugee flows to Europe should be created.

Personal life
Gualthérie van Weezel is married to Gerarda Gezina Jolande "Ank" de Visser. The couple has two daughters and one son. His daughter Annemarie married Carlos, Duke of Parma in 2010.

Gualthérie van Weezel was made Knight in the Order of the Netherlands Lion on 28 April 1989.

Works
 Rechts door het midden (1994)

References

1941 births
Living people
Ambassadors of the Netherlands to Luxembourg
Christian Democratic Appeal politicians
Christian Historical Union politicians
20th-century Dutch politicians
Knights of the Order of the Netherlands Lion
Leiden University alumni
Members of the House of Representatives (Netherlands)
People from Velsen
Hans